Alistair Graham Hamilton Orr (born 6 April 2001) is an English cricketer. He made his first-class debut on 3 June 2021, for Sussex in the 2021 County Championship. The following month, Orr scored his maiden century in first-class cricket, with 119 runs against Kent.

A former pupil of Bede's School, Eastbourne he also represented Loughborough University. He made his List A debut on 30 July 2021, for Sussex in the 2021 Royal London One-Day Cup. He made his Twenty20 debut on 3 June 2022, for Sussex in the 2022 T20 Blast.

References

External links
 

2001 births
Living people
English cricketers
Sussex cricketers
Sportspeople from Eastbourne